The 1958 All-Big Seven Conference football team consists of American football players chosen by various organizations for All-Big Seven Conference teams for the 1958 NCAA University Division football season.  The selectors for the 1958 season included the Associated Press (AP) and the United Press International (UPI).  Players selected as first-team players by both the AP and UPI are designated in bold.

All-Big Eight selections

Backs
 Boyd Dowler, Colorado (AP-1; UPI-1 [QB])
 Homer Floyd, Kansas (AP-1; UPI-1 [HB])
 Dwight Nichols, Iowa State (AP-1; UPI-1 [HB])
 Prentice Gautt, Oklahoma (AP-1; UPI-1 [FB])

Ends
 Dan LaRose, Missouri (AP-1; UPI-1)
 Ross Coyle, Oklahoma (AP-1; UPI-1)

Tackles
 Jack Himelwright, Colorado (AP-1)
 Gilmer Lewis, Oklahoma (AP-1)
 John Peppercorn, Iowa State (UPI-1)
 Steve Jennings, Oklahoma (UPI-1)

Guards
 Charles Rash, Missouri (AP-1; UPI-1)
 Dick Corbitt, Oklahoma (AP-1)
 Don Chadwick, (UPI-1)

Centers
 Bob Harrison, Oklahoma (AP-1; UPI-1)

Key
AP = Associated Press

UPI = United Press International

See also
1958 College Football All-America Team

References

All-Big Seven Conference football team
All-Big Eight Conference football teams